Janq'u Quta (Aymara janq'u white, quta lake, "white lake", also spelled Jankho Khota, Jankho Kkota) is a mountain in the Bolivian Andes which reaches a height of approximately . It is located in the La Paz Department, Loayza Province, Cairoma Municipality.

References 

Mountains of La Paz Department (Bolivia)